Transmodel (formally CEN TC278, Reference Data Model For Public Transport, EN12896) is the CEN European Reference Data Model for Public Transport Information; it provides a conceptual model of common  public transport concepts and data structures that can be used to build many different kinds of public transport information system, including for timetabling, fares, operational management, real time data, journey planning etc.

Scope
Transmodel provides a comprehensive conceptual model for public transport (PT) information systems including  passenger information systems, with coverage of a number of different subdomains of PT information, including transport network infrastructure and topology, public transport schedules, journey planning, fares, fare validation, real-time passenger information and operational aspects  of public transport.

 It is documented and diagrammed as an entity-relationship model and in Unified Modeling Language (UML), accompanied by detailed descriptions of the concepts, elements and attributes needed to represent transport information.
 It uses modern informational architecture principles to separate different concerns as independent layers.
 It makes extensive use of node and link concepts to describe individual transport information layers.
 It supports the reuse of transport information entities for different applications.
 It can represent multi-modal, multi-operator transport systems, with many different organisational structures, complex fare models, and different organisational practices.

Transmodel establishes a consistent terminology for describing public transport concepts, providing definitive equivalents for use in the National Languages of each participant nation. Where PT related words in vernacular use may span a number of different concepts and lead to differences of interpretation,  it establishes a more precise technical terminology   for unambiguous  use by PT information system developers. For example the terms  'trip', 'journey', 'service', are overlapping concepts that in Transmodel are  used only in a more specific usages.

As of 2021, the current version of Transmodel is 6.0.

History
Transmodel was originally developed within a range of European projects under several European Programmes (Drive I, Drive II, TAP) with the support of the European Commission (DGXIII), and  national public institutions, in particular  the French Ministry of Transport (Direction des Transports Terrestres) as well as several private companies.

Initial development & First Generation use
 Transmodel development started with the Cassiope project (1989-1991, Drive I programme). The results of Cassiope were then developed further by the EuroBus and Harpist (Drive II) projects.   This produced Transmodel  V4.1 ENV 12896 with a E/R “Oracle” formalism.
 The Telematics Applications Programme project TITAN (1996-1998) continued to validate and enhance Transmodel implementing it in three European pilot sites and has accompanied the standardisation process of Transmodel, voted in 1997 as the European experimental norm ENV 12896.  This led to Transmodel V5.0: with multi-modality, real-time control, layers, and data versioning
 SITP: Système d'Information pour le Transport Public (Information System for Public Transport) started in 1999 under the sponsorship of the French Ministry of Transport, which supports the Transmodel site.  SITP developed Transmodel V5.1, adding a UML formalism.

In 2006 version 5.1 of Transmodel was formally adopted by CEN as a European standard, EN12896.

Second Generation use of Transmodel  (Transmodel V5.1) 
Transmodel has been fundamental to the development of a number of concrete national data models and European Standards, including both European standards  Service Interface for Real Time Information (SIRI: 2001-2005, now a CEN technical specification) for Real-time data exchange for buses, and Identification of Fixed Objects In Public Transport (2006-2007), now assimilated into Transmodel v6.0 Part2, and   national standards such as  TransXChange (2001-2005,  now the UK standard for bus PT timetables), and the French Trident standard (1999-2003).  Its provision of a uniform conceptual framework, consistent terminology and well grounded abstractions make it especially valuable for comparing, harmonising and modernising legacy standards and systems and for international cooperation.

Third Generation (Transmodel v6.0) 
 Transmodel based applications are now in widespread use through many parts of Europe for exchanging timetable and real-time data. A revised V6.0 version of Transmodel incorporating additional capabilities and breaking the specification into eight separate modules is underdevelopment.  Parts 1, 2 & 3, covering respectively common concepts, network descriptions, and timetables were published in 2015. Parts 4 to 8, covering operational actions, fares, passenger information services, driver management, and management information and statistics were published in 2019. 
 NeTEx: (NETwork EXchange) is a concrete XML scheme implementing the central components of the Transmodel model as a modular W3C schema.  It was developed as a CEN Technical Standard by CEN WG278 SG9 between 2009 and 2014 as a European-wide format for exchanging inter-modal stop, timetable, and fare data for public transport.  A revised version is under development  for completion in 2018.  
 In 2017, under the Intelligent Transport Systems Priority Action A Directive (2010/40/E), the European Commission recognized NeTEx as a strategic standard for the cross-border exchange of data to  enable the provision of EU-wide multi-modal travel information services, with the aim of making data available in NeTEx format at National Access Points in all European countries.

See also
 TransXChange
 Transport Direct
 Transport standards organisations
 NeTEx
 Identification of Fixed Objects In Public Transport (IFOPT)
 Service Interface for Real Time Information (SIRI)

References

 Comité Européen de Normalisation (CEN), Reference Data Model For Public Transport, EN12896
 EN 12896:2006, Public Transport Reference Data Model (“Transmodel v5.1”)
 EN 12896-1:2016, Public Transport Reference Data Model - Part 1: Common Concepts (“Transmodel v6”)
 EN 12896-2:2016, Public Transport Reference Data Model - Part 2: Public Transport Network (“Transmodel v6”)
 EN 12896-3:2016, Public Transport Reference Data Model - Part 3: Timing Information and Vehicle Scheduling (“Transmodel v6”)
 EN 12896-4:2019, Public Transport Reference Data Model – Part 4: Operations Monitoring and Control (“Transmodel v6”)
 EN 12896-5:2019, Public Transport Reference Data Model – Part 5: Fare Management (“Transmodel v6”)
 EN 12896-6:2019, Public Transport Reference Data Model – Part 6: Passenger Information (“Transmodel v6”)
 EN 12896-7:2019, Public Transport Reference Data Model – Part 7: Driver Management (“Transmodel v6”)
 EN 12896-8:2019, Public Transport Reference Data Model – Part 8: Management Information & Statistics (“Transmodel v6”)
 PD CEN/TR 12896-9:2019, Public Transport Reference Data Model – Informative documentation

External links
 Transmodel  
 NeTEx
 OpRa

Public transport information systems
Travel technology
Transport in Europe